Mary-Kate Geraghty—known as MayKay—is an Irish musician known as the frontwoman of Fight Like Apes, with whom she has released numerous records and received several award nominations. She has also given solo performances as a DJ. In addition to this, herself and Duke Special lent their voices to an event at the National Concert Hall on 1 July 2010.

Nadine O'Regan of The Sunday Business Post has described her as "easily one of the best – and most mesmerising – front women Ireland has delivered in recent times" and possessing "an air of unpredictability that means crowds will crane their necks to make sure they see as well as hear her". Today FM presenter Alison Curtis has described her as "extremely watchable, almost going into Debbie Harry territory". Lauren Murphy of entertainment.ie praised her ability to sing "pastoral as well as blow-your-eardrums-out cacophony" on the track "Snore Bore Whore". The Munster Express described MayKay as being at her "breathy vampish best" on the same track. Male fans have professed simultaneous feelings of terror and attraction online.

A native of County Kildare, MayKay was born in 1986. She is the daughter of journalist Kathy Sheridan. Sheridan is a regular Fight Like Apes concert-goer and bought a record player specially to listen to the band's debut album on vinyl.

She was a choir singer for some time. The singer met bandmate Jamie (known as "Pockets") when the pair were vacationing in Spain during their teenage years. She spoke of their meeting in a 2007 interview with Eamon Sweeney of the Irish Independent: "One night, I told Jamie I loved singing, so he made me sign a contract on a piece of tissue in a bar saying that I would never do anything musically without him". She studied medicinal chemistry then philosophy in Trinity College, Dublin; however, she dropped out of college when Fight Like Apes began to first find success.

On stage MayKay dresses in either black or white and is known for her "long black hair and banshee wail". She often plays the keyboard with her head during live performances. She has also played the drill. She and most of the band members, with the exception of the drummer, are known for their consumption of alcohol. She likes bands such as Adebisi Shank, Giveamanakick, Grand Pocket Orchestra and Jape. MayKay has also collaborated with Elaine Mai on 'No Forever' (2021).

References

External links 
 MayKay speaks to Elaine Hughes of Hot Press about her 2007
 Video interview with Jenny Huston from RTÉ 2fm at Oxegen 2008.
 Photos of MayKay from the website of Channel 4 show The JD Set

Irish rock musicians
Irish rock singers
1986 births
Living people
Date of birth missing (living people)
People from County Kildare
21st-century Irish singers
21st-century Irish women singers
Irish women singers
Other Voices presenters